Aqcheh Kand may refer to:

Aqcheh Kand, Ardabil
Aqcheh Kand, East Azerbaijan
Aqcheh Kand, Qazvin
Aqcheh Kand, Zanjan
Aqcheh Kand, Khodabandeh, Zanjan Province